Cassa di Risparmio delle Provincie Lombarde  known as Cariplo SpA, was an Italian bank. On 2 January 1998 the bank merged with Banco Ambrosiano Veneto to form Banca Intesa. The company became a short-lived sub-holding company in late 1990s, which was completely absorbed circa 2000.

History
The bank was formed on 12 June 1823 by the count Giovanni Pietro Porro, in Kingdom of Lombardy–Venetia, decades before the unification of Italy. Situated in industrialized Northern Italy, the Lombard firm had become one of the major bank in Italy. In 1926 the bank absorbed Cassa di Risparmio di Voghera and Cassa di Risparmio di Novara in 1928.

In December 1991, due to Legge Amato, the bank, as società per azioni, and Fondazione Cariplo were formed to separate ownership, charity and daily banking operation.

The bank also started its own expansion strategy 1990s, which acquired shares of the saving banks of Alessandria, Carrara and Spezia to form Carinord Holding SpA in 1995, (Ca.Ri."Nord", a joint venture of the owners of Alessandria, Carrara and Spezia and Cariplo) as well as Calabria e Lucania (Carical), Puglia (Caripuglia), Salernitana (Carisal) (the formation of Banca Carime). In Marche, Fermo (33.3%), Ascoli (25%), Banca delle Marche (5.13%) were acquired. In Umbria, Spoleto, Città di Castello, Foligno (18.34%); in Lazio the province of Viterbo and Rieti; in Abruzzo Cassa di Risparmio della Provincia di Chieti, Cassa di Risparmio della Provincia di Teramo and Cassa di Risparmio di Pescara e Loreto Aprutino (20% each).

Other banks acquired were Banca Monte Parma (20.5%), German bank Bankhaus Löbbecke and Hungarian bank Európai Kereskedelmi Bank.

In 1997 Fondazione Cariplo and Cariverona agreed a deal on Banco Ambrosiano Veneto's shares, which led to the ultimate merger on 2 January 1998. On 30 September 1997 Fondazione Cariplo held 13.42% shares of Banco Ambrosiano Veneto and 100% shares of Cariplo SpA.

See also
 Fondazione Cariplo

References

External links
  Group History Intesa Sanpaolo official website

Defunct banks of Italy
Banks established in 1823
Banks disestablished in 1998
1823 establishments in the Austrian Empire
1998 disestablishments in Italy
Companies based in Milan
 Cassa di Risparmio delle Provincie Lombarde
Italian companies established in 1823